Schledde may refer to:

Schledde (Ahse), a river of North Rhine-Westphalia, Germany, tributary of the Ahse
Schledde (Störmeder Bach), a river of North Rhine-Westphalia, Germany, tributary of the Störmeder Bach